Raise the Red Lantern is a 1991 film directed by Zhang Yimou and starring Gong Li. The film was later adapted into an acclaimed ballet of the same title by the National Ballet of China, also directed by Zhang.

Set in the 1920s, the film tells the story of a young woman who becomes one of the concubines of a wealthy man during the Warlord Era. It is noted for its opulent visuals and sumptuous use of colours.  The film was shot in the Qiao Family Compound near the ancient city of Pingyao, in Shanxi Province. Although the screenplay was approved by Chinese censors, the final version of the film was banned in China for a period.

Plot
The film is set in 1920s Republican era. Nineteen-year-old Songlian (played by Gong Li), an educated woman whose father has recently died and left the family bankrupt, is forced by her stepmother to marry into the wealthy Chen family, becoming the fourth concubine or, as she is referred to, the Fourth Mistress (Sì Tàitai) of the household. Arriving at the palatial abode, she is at first treated like royalty, receiving sensuous foot massages and brightly lit red lanterns, as well as a visit from her husband, Master Chen (Ma Jingwu), the master of the house, whose face is never clearly shown.

Songlian soon discovers, however, that not all the concubines in the household receive the same luxurious treatment. In fact, the master decides on a daily basis the concubine with whom he will spend the night; whomever he chooses gets her lanterns lit, receives the foot massage, gets her choice of menu items at mealtime, and gets the most attention and respect from the servants. Pitted in constant competition against each other, the three concubines are continually vying for their husband's attention and affections.

The First Mistress, Yuru (Jin Shuyuan), appears to be nearly as old as the master himself. Having borne a son decades earlier, she seems resigned to live out her life as forgotten, always passed over in favor of the younger concubines. The Second Mistress, Zhuoyun (Zhuóyún, Cao Cuifen), befriends Songlian, complimenting her youth and beauty, and giving her expensive silk as a gift; she also warns her about the Third Mistress, Meishan (Méishan, He Saifei), a former opera singer who is spoiled and who becomes unable to cope with no longer being the youngest and most favored of the master's playthings. As time passes, though, Songlian learns that it is really Zhuoyun, the Second Mistress, who is not to be trusted; she is subsequently described as having the face of the Buddha, yet possessing the heart of a scorpion. She also has to deal with her personal maid, Yan'er (Yàn'ér, played by Kong Lin), who hates her and dreams of being a concubine after a few brief flings with the Master.

Songlian feigns pregnancy, attempting to garner the majority of the master's time and, at the same time, attempting to become actually pregnant. Zhuoyun, however, is in league with Yan'er who finds and reveals a pair of bloodied undergarments, suggesting that Songlian had recently had her period, and discovers the pregnancy is a fraud.

Zhuoyun summons the family physician, feigning concern for Songlian's "pregnancy". Doctor Gao (Gao-yisheng, Cui Zhigang), who is secretly having an illicit affair with Third Mistress Meishan, examines Songlian and determines the pregnancy to be a sham. Infuriated, the master orders Songlian's lanterns covered with thick black canvas bags indefinitely. Blaming the sequence of events on Yan'er, Songlian reveals to the house that Yan'er's room is filled with lit red lanterns, showing that Yan'er dreams of becoming a mistress instead of a lowly servant; it is suggested earlier that Yan'er is in love with the master and has even slept with him in the Fourth Mistress' bed.

Yan'er is punished by having the lanterns burned while she kneels in the snow, watching as they smolder. In an act of defiance, Yan'er refuses to humble herself or apologize, and thus remains kneeling in the snow throughout the night until she collapses. Yan'er falls sick and ultimately dies after being taken to the hospital. One of the servants tells Songlian that her former maid died with her mistress's name on her lips. Songlian, who had briefly attended university before the passing of her father and being forced into marriage, comes to the conclusion that she is happier in solitude; she eventually sees the competition between the concubines as a useless endeavor, as each woman is merely a "robe" that the master may wear and discard at his discretion.

As Songlian retreats further into her solitude, she begins speaking of suicide; she reasons that dying is a better fate than being a concubine in the Chen household. On her twentieth birthday, severely intoxicated and despondent over her bitter fate, Songlian inadvertently blurts out the details of the love affair between Meishan and Doctor Gao to Zhuoyun, who later catches the adulterous couple together. Following the old customs and traditions, Meishan is dragged to a lone room (also known as the room of death earlier on) on the roof of the estate and is hanged to death by the master's servants.

Songlian, already in agony due to the fruitlessness of her life, witnesses the entire episode and is emotionally traumatized. The following summer, after the Master's marriage to yet another concubine, Songlian is shown wandering the compound in her old schoolgirl clothes, appearing to have gone completely insane.

Cast
Gong Li as Songlian - Known as Lotus in the English version of the novel.
He Saifei as Meishan, the third mistress - Known as Coral in the English version of the novel.
Cao Cuifen as Zhuoyun, the second mistress  - Known as Cloud in the English version of the novel.
Kong Lin as Yan'er, Songlian's young servant - Known as Swallow in the English version of the novel.
Zhou Qi as housekeeper Chen Baishun
Jin Shuyuan (金淑媛) as Yuru, the first wife - Known as Joy in the English version of the novel.
 as Chen Zuoqian or Master Chen
Cui Zhihgang as Doctor Gao
Chu Xiao as Feipu, the master's eldest son
Cao Zhengyin as Songlian's old servant
Ding Weimin as Songlian's mother

Soundtrack

All songs composed by Zhao Jiping.
 "Opening Credits/Prologue/Zhouyun/Lanterns"
 "First Night With Master/Alone on First Night Second Night Third Night"
 "Summer"
 "Flute Solo"
 "Record"
 "Autumn"
 "Births/The Peking Theme"
 "Pregnancy/Yan'er's Punishment"
 "Meishan Sings"
 "Young Master Returns Meishan's Punishment"
 "Realization"
 "Winter"
 "Ghost"
 "Seasons"
 "Next Summer"
 "House of Death"
 "Fifth Mistress"
 "Songlian's Madness/End Credits"

Distribution
Raise the Red Lantern has been distributed on VHS, Laserdisc and DVD by numerous different distributors, with many coming under criticism for their poor quality.

The Razor Digital Entertainment DVD release has been widely criticised. DVD Times states "Many other viewers will find this DVD release simply intolerable." DVDTown criticised the same release, giving the video quality 1 out of 10 and the audio quality 6 out of 10, summarising that "the video is a disaster". DVDFile adds to this stating "this horrible DVD is only recommended to those who love the movie so much, that they’ll put up with anything to own a Region 1 release." The translation on this version has been also widely criticised for its numerous inaccuracies. A release by Rajon Vision has also received poor commentary

ERA's first release received similar attention but the second digitally remastered edition has been more warmly received with DVD Times stating that "It's a film that really needs a Criterion edition with a new print or a full restoration, but in the absence of any likelihood of that, this Era Hong Kong edition is about as good as you could hope for." DVDBeaver broadly agrees stating "Now, this is not Criterion image quality, but it is not bad at all. It is easily the best digital representation of this film currently available." DVD Talk, though, believes that "This new version is a stunner".

A new MGM release in 2007 has also received some positive feedback.

Reception
Described as "one of the landmark films of the 1990s" by Jonathan Crow of AllMovie, where it received 5 stars, since its release Raise the Red Lantern has been very well received. James Berardinelli named it his 7th best film of the 1990s. It has a 97% certified fresh rating at review aggregator website Rotten Tomatoes, based on 29 reviews, with an average rating of 8.5/10. and TV Guide gave it 5 stars. However, there were a small number of negative reviews. Hal Hinson of The Washington Post stated that "the story never amounts to much more than a rather tepid Chinese rendition of "The Women."  The film ranked #28 in Empire magazines "The 100 Best Films Of World Cinema" in 2010.

The film has also been praised for its artistic merit. Desson Howe of The Washington Post stated that "In purely aesthetic terms, "Raise the Red Lantern" is breathtaking" and James Berardinelli stated that "the appeal to the eye only heightens the movie's emotional power".  John Hartl of Film.com described it to be "a near-perfect movie that often recalls the visual purity and intensity of silent films."

The film has been interpreted by some critics as a criticism of contemporary China, although Zhang Yimou himself has denied this. Jonathan Crow of AllMovie stated that "the perpetual struggle for power that precludes any unity among the wives provides a depressingly apt metaphor for the fragmented civil society of post-Cultural Revolution China".  James Berardinelli made a similar analogy in his review where he stated that "Songlian is the individual, the master is the government, and the customs of the house are the laws of the country. It's an archaic system that rewards those who play within the rules and destroys those who violate them.". An online article suggested that in such a system, the innocent individual becomes the executioner of new incoming victims, making the outcome even more tragic.

Chinese journalist and activist Dai Qing has said that the film, along with many of Zhang Yimou's earlier works, caters too much to Western taste; "this kind of film is really shot for the casual pleasures of foreigners".

The film's popularity has also been attributed to a resurgence in Chinese tourism after the government response to the Tiananmen Square Protests of 1989 due to its use of exotic locations.

Raise the Red Lantern was one of the films with most appearances on 1992's year-end lists, appearing on 36 lists.

Accolades and nominations

Recognition 
Empire 100 Best Films of World Cinema – #28
Time Out 100 Best Chinese Mainland Films – #13
 Included in The New York Times'''s list of The Best 1000 Movies Ever Made in 2004
 Included in BBC's 2018 list of The 100 greatest foreign language films voted by 209 film critics from 43 countries around the world.

References

Further reading
 "Chapter 2: Su Tong and Zhang Yimou: Women's Places in Raise the Red Lantern": Deppman, Hsiu-chuang. Adapted for the Screen: The Cultural Politics of Modern Chinese Fiction and Film. University of Hawaii Press, 30 June 2010. , 9780824833732. p. 32.
 Fried, Ellen J. - "Food, Sex, and Power at the Dining Room Table in Zhang Yimou's Raise the Red Lantern." - In Bower, Anne Reel Food: Essays on Food and Film. Psychology Press, 2004. p. 129-143. , 9780415971119.
 Giskin, Howard and Bettye S. Walsh. An Introduction to Chinese Culture through the Family. SUNY Press, 2001. p. 198-201.
 Hsiao, Li-ling. "Dancing the Red Lantern: Zhang Yimou’s Fusion of Western Ballet and Peking Opera." (Archive) Southeast Review of Asian Studies, University of North Carolina at Chapel Hill. Volume 32 (2010), pp. 129–36.

External links
 
 
 
 "Raise the Red Lantern (1991)." The New York Times.
 Qiao's Compound, the filming location
 Howe, Desson. "‘Raise the Red Lantern’ (PG)." The Washington Post. 8 May 1992.
 Ebert, Roger. "Raise the Red Lantern (1990) ." Chicago Sun-Times''. 27 April 2003.

1991 films
Chinese romantic drama films
Hong Kong romantic drama films
1990s Mandarin-language films
1991 drama films
1990s feminist films
Films based on Chinese novels
Films directed by Zhang Yimou
Films set in the Republic of China (1912–1949)
Best Foreign Language Film BAFTA Award winners
Films set in the 1920s
Films shot in Shanxi
1990s Hong Kong films